Winifred Evelyn Spooner (11 September 1900 – 13 January 1933), the daughter of Major Walter B. Spooner and Annie Spooner, was an English aviator of the 1920s and 1930s, and the winner of the Harmon Trophy as the world's outstanding female aviator of 1929. She died aged 32 from pneumonia.

Early life and education 
Winifred Spooner was born in Woolwich in Kent. She attended Sherborne Girls in Dorset.

She received a pilot's licence No. 8137 from London Aeroplane Club in September 1927, and then she became active competitor in sports aviation. She became only the 16th woman to receive a licence. She also received an Aviator's Certificate in the USA, dated 21 August 1931 and signed by Orville Wright.

Winifred's brothers, Tony and Frank, had leased some farmland and stables near Folly Court in Wokingham where they schooled and sold polo-ponies, hunters and steeplechasers. They called their enterprise The Polo Farm. During the First World War Frank had served as a cavalry officer in India, and from 1917 to 1918, had been the head of the equestrian school. Winifred's other brother, Captain Hugh “Tony” Spooner, who served in the 19th King George’s Own Lancers, married to Glenda Spooner, was Superintendent of Flying Operations and Chief Pilot to the Misr-Airwork Company of Egypt. He was killed in a flying accident in a sandstorm in Egypt on 15 March 1935.

There was a field on the farm big enough upon which to land a light aircraft, so Winifred built a wooden hangar and moved her Moth from Stag Lane. During this period Winifred, Hugh and Frank resided at No. 4, South Drive in Wokingham. Winifred continued her Air-Taxi Service, charging £4 an hour or one shilling a mile, covering Britain and France, and gave flying lessons. She also purchased a car. Wokingham locals recall her being one of the first woman drivers in the area. Some time later she moved to Scott's Farm near Bearwood, now part of Woosehill.

Achievements 
In July 1928 she took the 3rd place in the seventh King's Cup Race and won the Siddeley Trophy as the first Aeroplane Club aviator to cross the line (flying DH.60 Cirrus I Moth).

In 1929 she finished fifth in the King's Cup Race, and won the Harmon Trophy as the world's outstanding female aviator. She also took 10th place in the International Tourist Plane Contests Challenge.

In 1930 she was a member of the British team at the International Tourist Plane Contest Challenge 1930 between 16 July and 8 August in Berlin, Germany, finishing the rally seventh overall in her De Havilland Gipsy Moth. She completed the whole contest on a high 4th position. In late August of the same year she was fourth in the handicapped race Giro Aereo d'Italia in Italy.

On 5 December 1930, accompanied by Captain Edwards, she set out to prove that South Africa could be reached within 5 days by flying day and night. After 16 hours while Captain Edwards was flying the aircraft and Winifred was asleep, the plane crashed into the sea off the coast of Belmonte Calabro in complete darkness. Captain Edwards could not give a reason for the plane steadily losing height without his knowledge. As Captain Edwards was quite badly injured Winifred left him sitting on the wooden fuselage and swam ashore "6 strokes at a time". She was about 2 miles offshore. She then alerted local fishermen who set out to rescue Captain Edwards and the plane.

She participated in three out of four F.A.I – International Tourist Plane Contests – Challenge 1929, Challenge 1930, Challenge 1932, as one of only two women; being one of top contestants and taking the 10th place in 1929 and 4th place in 1930. In 1932 she occupied the 4th position after technical trials, but she decided to withdraw after a forced landing, caused by a sabotage on her fuel.

In 1931, she took the fifth place in the King's Cup Race and became the first British woman to earn her living as a private owner's personal pilot flying air racer and MP, Sir William Lindsay Everard, all over Britain, Europe, Turkey and the Middle East.

She is reported to have crashed an aircraft in Cleator Moor in Cumberland, UK. The date is unknown but the plane was taken to the Mill Yard, and Spooner is reported to have suffered no more than tattered stockings.

Death 
In January 1933 Spooner, who was never ill, caught a cold while at  Ratcliffe Aerodrome, Leicestershire, which rapidly worsened and she took to her bed. Pneumonia set in on the following day and the local doctor sent for a specialist from Nottingham. Unfortunately, because of thick fog, the specialist lost his way and the oxygen he was bringing, which might have saved her life, arrived too late: Spooner suffered a heart attack, and, despite an injection of strychnine, died the next day, on 13 January. The bad luck that had dogged Spooner all her life, and which had cost her numerous trophies and earned her the nickname 'bad luck Wimpey', had followed her to the end.

Her remains were taken to St. Swithin's Church at Hinton Parva, near Swindon in Wiltshire for burial beside her parents. The Rev. W. Lucas Stubbs, the Rev. C.F. Burgess and the Rev. Gordon Soames conducted the service, and in addition to members of her family, those present included:- Captain Tregona representing the Italian Government; the Italian Air Minister, General Italo Balbo, Commander H.E. Perrin, Secretary of the Royal Aero Club and her former employer, Lindsay Everard.
A memorial service was held for Winifred four days later at St. Peter's in Eaton Square, London. Many attended, including Viscountess Elibank; Lt.-Col. F.C. Shelmerdine, Director of Civil Aviation; Lady Acton and Kathleen Countess of Drogheda representing the Women's Committee, Air League.

Commemoration 
A bronze bust of Winifred Spooner, created by Donald Gilbert, was unveiled on 30 May 1934 by Lindsay Everard MP at the headquarters of the Women’s Automobile and Sports Association, presented by an anonymous donor.

Sherborne Memorial Scholarship 
In 1936, Spooner's close friend, Dugald MacPherson, founded a memorial scholarship to her memory at Sherborne School for Girls. The object of the scholarship is the encouragement of character rather than book learning; in the award, special consideration is given to courage, enterprise, independence and generosity of mind—qualities that Winifred possessed. The sum awarded may help a girl to follow her bent, or help her pay for her education in a chosen career, is also one of the objects of the scholarship.

Further reading

 Miss Winifred Spooner, Aviatrix, Jim Bell, 2009.

References

External links

Winfred E. Spooner at Early Aviators

English aviators
Harmon Trophy winners
1900 births
1933 deaths
People from Wokingham
British women aviators
People from Woolwich
Deaths from pneumonia in England